Telman Abbasgulu oglu Adigozalov (17 July 1953, Balakan Rayon – 15 April 2010, Baku) was an Azerbaijani film, television and theatre actor, TV presenter, People Artist of Azerbaijan (2006).

Early life
Telman Adigozalov was born on July 17, 1953 in Balakan region of Azerbaijan. He graduated from the School of Drama and Cinema of Azerbaijan State Art Institute and was working for the Azerbaijan National Drama Theater.

Contributions
He is mostly remembered for vivid roles in many performances such as in Hurshudbanu Natavan, The Song Remained in the Mountains, Macbeth, The Devil, Vagif and Oh, Paris, Paris....

He also appeared in several television productions, including The man in green eyeshades, Ordan-Burdan, Neighbours, in the movies Nasimi, Face to the Wind and I grew up on the beach.

Honours
Adigozalov was awarded with the titles of honorable artist of Azerbaijan in 2000 and Azerbaijan people’s artist in 2006.

See also
Jeyhun Mirzayev

References

External links
 

1953 births
2010 deaths
People from Balakən
Azerbaijani male television actors
Azerbaijani male film actors
Azerbaijani male stage actors
Soviet male actors
People's Artists of Azerbaijan
Soviet Azerbaijani people